Benpica Football Club (simply known as Benpica) is an Indonesian football club based in Karawang Regency, West Java. They currently compete in the Liga 3.

History
Benpica FC was established on 1975, but they first participated in the PSSI national competition in 2011 (Division 3 West Java), then participated in the 2014 Liga Nusantara and now the 2021 Liga 3 West Java zone. Started as an amateur football club and they only leveled up to semi-professional in 2011.

Benpica FC opened its academy club by collaborating with Persib Bandung. Both of them recently, they inaugurated a soccer school called Persib-Benpica Cikampek Academy. Persib-Benpica Cikampek Academy has five teams between ages, including U-10, U-12, U-14, U-16, and U-18. they practice three times a week (Tuesday, Thursday, Saturday) at the Anda S. Mini Stadium and the North Pangulah Football Field.

References

External links

Karawang Regency
Sport in West Java
Football clubs in Indonesia
Football clubs in West Java
Association football clubs established in 1975
1975 establishments in Indonesia